Kiriri may refer to:

Kiriri, Kenya
Kiriri people, an indigenous people of Brazil
 Kiriri, variant of Keriri, Indigenous name for Hammond Island (Queensland)

Languages
Kiriri languages, or Kariri languages, a group of extinct languages spoken by the Kiriri people
Dzubukua, or Kiriri, an extinct language or dialect formerly spoken by the Kiriri people
Kipea language, or Kiriri, another extinct language or dialect formerly spoken by the Kiriri people
Katembri language, also known as Kiriri, distinct from the Kariri languages
Xukuru language, also known as Kiriri, distinct from the Kariri languages
Xocó language, also known as Kiriri, distinct from the Kariri languages